The Ligue 2 2009–10 season was the sixty-ninth edition since its establishment. The fixtures were announced on 5 June 2009, and the league began on 7 August and ended on 14 May 2010.

German sportswear company Puma became the official provider of match balls for the season after agreeing to a long term partnership with the Ligue de Football Professionnel.

Promotion and relegation
Teams relegated from 2008–09 Ligue 1
 18th Place: Caen
 19th Place: Nantes
 20th Place: Le Havre

Teams promoted to 2009–10 Ligue 1
 Champions: Lens
 Runners-up: Montpellier
 3rd Place: Boulogne

Teams promoted from 2008–09 Championnat National
 Champions: Istres
 Runners-up: Laval
 3rd Place: Arles-Avignon

Teams relegated to 2009–10 Championnat National
 18th Place: Amiens
 19th Place: Reims
 20th Place: Troyes

DNCG Ruling on Arles-Avignon
All clubs that secured status for Ligue 2 play this season had to be approve by the DNCG before becoming eligible to participate.

On 23 June, the DNCG ruled that AC Arles-Avignon would not be allowed to play in Ligue 2 following their promotion from the Championnat National, due to irregularities in the club's financial accounts and management. On 3 July, following an appeal, the DNCG reversed its decision reinstating Arles' Ligue 2 status.

League table

Results

Statistics

Top goalscorers

Last updated: 3 June 2010
Source: Ligue 2

Assists table

Last updated: 3 June 2010
Source: Ligue 2

Scoring
First goal of the season: Magaye Gueye for Strasbourg against Châteauroux, 1 minute and 20 seconds. (7 August 2009).
Fastest goal in a match: 8 seconds – Rémi Maréval for Nantes against Nîmes. (26 September 2009).
Goal scored at the latest point in a match: 90+2 minutes and 36 seconds – Nolan Roux for Brest against Laval (7 August 2009)
First own goal of the season: Thomas Mienniel (Angers) for Châteauroux, 38 minutes and 27 seconds (18 August 2009)
First penalty kick of the season: 5 minutes and 27 seconds – Jérôme Lebouc (scored) for Laval against Brest (7 August 2009).
Widest winning margin: 5 goals
Bastia 6–1 Nîmes (18 August 2009).
Nantes 5–0 Istres (21 August 2009).
Most goals in a match: 9 goals
Dijon 5–4 Châteauroux (30 October 2009).
Most goals in one half: 5 goals
Dijon v Châteauroux (30 October 2009); 1–3 at half time, 5–4 final.

Discipline
First yellow card of the season: Yvan Bourgis for Brest against Laval, 5 minutes and 37 seconds (7 August 2009)
First red card of the season: Vincent Bessat for Metz against Vannes, 57 minutes and 43 seconds (7 August 2009)
Card given at latest point in a game: Wahbi Khazri (yellow) at 90+4 minutes and 9 seconds for Bastia against Caen (14 August 2009)
Total cards in a single match: 9
Nantes 5–0 Istres – 6 for Nantes (Ibrahim Tall, William Vainqueur (yellow), Tenema N'Diaye, William Vainqueur (red), Ivan Klasnić, & Stefan Babović) and 3 for Istres (Mamadou Doumbia, Faouzi El Brazi, & Adel Chedli) (21 August 2009)
Most yellow cards in a single match: 9
Ajaccio 0–1 Guingamp – 5 for Ajaccio (Kévin Diaz, Thierry Debès, Jean-Philippe Sabo, Thomas Deruda, & Jonathan Martins) and 4 for Guingamp (Alharbi El-Jadeyaoui, Felipe Saad, Sébastien Grax, & Christian Bassila) (7 August 2009)
Most red cards in a single match: 3 – Bastia 6–1 Nîmes – 1 for Bastia (Mehdi Méniri) and 2 for Nîmes (Moussa Sidibé & Miodrag Stošić) (18 August 2009)

Awards
The nominees for the Player of the Year, Goalkeeper of the Year, and Manager of the Year in Ligue 2. The winner was determined at the annual UNFP Awards, which was held on 9 May. The winners are displayed in bold.

Player of the Year

Goalkeeper of the Year

Manager of the Year

Team of the Year

Team information

Stadiums

Last updated: 15 May 2010

References

External links
French League Official Site
Ligue 2 Official Page

Ligue 2 seasons
French
2